In complex analysis, a branch of mathematics, an isolated singularity is one that has no other singularities close to it. In other words, a complex number z0 is an isolated singularity of a function f if there exists an open disk D centered at z0 such that f is holomorphic on D \ {z0}, that is, on the set obtained from D by taking z0 out.

Formally, and within the general scope of general topology, an isolated singularity of a holomorphic function a function  is any isolated point of the boundary  of the domain .

Every singularity of a meromorphic function on an open subset  is isolated, but isolation of singularities alone is not sufficient to guarantee a function is meromorphic.  Many important tools of complex analysis such as Laurent series and the residue theorem require that all relevant singularities of the function be isolated.
There are three types of isolated singularities: removable singularities, poles and essential singularities.

Examples

The function  has 0 as an isolated singularity.
The cosecant function  has every integer as an isolated singularity.

Nonisolated singularities
Other than isolated singularities, complex functions of one variable may exhibit other singular behavior. Namely, two kinds of nonisolated singularities exist:

 Cluster points, i.e. limit points of isolated singularities: if they are all poles, despite admitting Laurent series expansions on each of them, no such expansion is possible at its limit.
 Natural boundaries, i.e. any non-isolated set (e.g. a curve) around which functions cannot be analytically continued (or outside them if they are closed curves in the Riemann sphere).

Examples

The function  has a singularity at 0 which is not isolated, since there are additional singularities at the reciprocal of every integer, which are located arbitrarily close to 0 (though the singularities at these reciprocals are themselves isolated).

External links 

  Ahlfors, L., Complex Analysis, 3 ed. (McGraw-Hill, 1979).

  Rudin, W., Real and Complex Analysis, 3 ed. (McGraw-Hill, 1986).

 

Complex analysis